Mother Mary Teresa Austin Carroll (born Margaret Anne Carroll; pen name, Austin Carroll; 23 February 1835 – 29 November 1909) was an Irish nun and writer who emigrated to the United States where she founded more than 20 convents.

Biography
Margaret Anne Carroll was born in Clonmel, Ireland, on 23 February 1835. Her parents were William and Margaret Strahan Carroll, and there were eight siblings. Carroll received most of her education at Clonmel National Model School. She entered the St Maries of the Isle Mercy Convent, Cork, in 1853, taking the name Sister Mary Teresa Austin in 1854; two years later she professed her first vows.

Carroll aided in establishing an Order in Buffalo, Rochester, Omaha, under Mother Mary Frances Xavier Warde. She established convents in New Orleans (1869), Biloxi, Mississippi, Florida, Alabama, Belize, British Honduras, and was in Selma, Alabama in 1895. In addition to her office of Superior during these years, Mother Austin was contributed to many periodical magazines, among them The American Catholic Quarterly Review, Philadelphia Catholic Record, Catholic World, Irish Monthly, besides a large European correspondence. She passed through several severe epidemics. Though Mother Austin spent much of her life in Europe, her literary life was spent in the US, in which schools she attended and established played a special role. She founded more than 20 convents in the U.S.

Carroll died on 29 November 1909 after suffering a series of strokes.

Selected works
 1861, The flowers of Paradise : a select manual of prayer and instruction
 1866, Life of Catherine McAuley, foundress and first superior of the Institute of religious Sisters of mercy
 1867, Happy hours of childhood : a series of tales for the little ones
 1869, Glimpses of pleasant homes. A few tales for youth
 1869, Angel-dreams : a series of tales for children
 1872, By the seaside : a child's story
 1874, The life of St. Alphonsus Liguori, Bishop, Confessor, and Doctor of the Church, Founder of the Congregation of the Most Holy Redeemer
 1877, Life of the Ven. Clement Mary Hofbauer, priest of the Congregation of the Most Holy Redeemer
 1881, Leaves from the Annals of the Sister of Mercy. In three volumes : I. Ireland. II. England, Scotland, and the colonies. III. America. Vol. I. Ireland : containing sketches of the convents established by the holy foundress, and their earlier developments
 1883, Mary Beatrice and her step-daughters, the uncrowned and the crowned : an historical drama
 1883, The Tudor sisters, an historical drama
 1885, Scenes from the life of Katharine of Aragon. An historical drama
 1886, The Ursulines in Louisiana : 1727–1824
 1894, Life of Mary Monholland : one of the pioneer sisters of the Order of Mercy in the West
 1904, In many lands
 1905, The father and the son, St. Alphonsus and St. Gerard
 1908, A Catholic history of Alabama and the Floridas
 1911, The litany of the Blessed Virgin

References

Attribution

1835 births
1909 deaths
19th-century Irish nuns
Irish non-fiction writers
Irish women writers
Irish emigrants to the United States (before 1923)
Irish women children's writers
Irish Roman Catholic abbesses
Female religious leaders
Women biographers
Pseudonymous women writers
20th-century Irish nuns
19th-century women writers
Founders of Christian monasteries
Women founders
19th-century pseudonymous writers
People from Clonmel